Geshmiran Rural District is a rural district (dehestan) in the Central District of Manujan County, Kerman Province, Iran. At the 2006 census, its population was 2,110, in 489 families. The rural district has 16 villages.

References 

Rural Districts of Kerman Province
Manujan County